The 2012 Speedy Hire UK Open was a Darts tournament staged in the UK by the Professional Darts Corporation. It was the tenth year of the tournament where, following numerous regional qualifying heats throughout Britain, players competed in a single elimination tournament to be crowned champion. The tournament was held at the Reebok Stadium in Bolton, England, between 7–10 June 2012, and has the nickname, "the FA Cup of darts" as a random draw is staged after each round until the final.

Robert Thornton won the tournament beating Phil Taylor 11–5 in the final to win his first PDC major.

Format and qualifiers

2012 UK Open qualifiers
There were eight qualifying events staged across England between February and May 2012 to determine the UK Open Order of Merit Table. The tournament winners were:

The tournament featured 178 players. The results of the eight qualifiers shown above were collated into the UK Open Order of Merit. The top 32 players and ties in the Order of Merit, who played a minimum of two events, received a place at the final tournament. In addition, the next 82 players in the Order of Merit list qualified for the tournament, but needed to start in the earlier rounds played on the Thursday. A further 64 players qualified via regional qualifying tournaments.

Top 32 in Order of Merit (receiving byes into third round)

Number 33–64 of the Order of Merit (receiving byes into second round)

Remaining Order of Merit qualifiers (starting in first and preliminary round)

Rileys qualifiers
32 players qualified from Rileys qualifiers held in Rileys Dart Zones across Britain.

Speedy qualifiers
32 players qualified from Speedy qualifiers held at seven venues across Britain from April to May.

Brighton
  Alan Casey
  Bob Crawley
  Gary Ettridge
  Jon Jukes
Dartford
  Paul Amos
  Michael Wiles
  Thomas Sandwell
  Dave Solly

Inverness
  Ryan Murray
  Andy Murray
  Nicky Denoon
  Craig McCaskill
Leeds
  Danny Dutson
  Mick Hayward
  Steve Service

Stoke-on-Trent
  Steve Mason
  Paul Whitworth
  David Pallett
  Paul Harvey
Cardiff
  Lee Russell
  Steve Werrett
  Paul Boulton
  Jon Farmer
  Glenn Miller

Haydock
  Ben Johnson
  Paul Critchley
  Andy Melling
  Mark Kelly
  Mark Spencer
  Darrin Pugh
  Kirk Gordon
  Stuart Daniels

Prize money
For the fourth consecutive UK Open, the prize fund will be £200,000.

Draw
The draw for the preliminary, first and second rounds was made on 10 May.

Thursday 7 June; Best of 7 legs

Preliminary round

 † John Henderson received a bye as Lee Bryant was disqualified due to failing to register at the event.
 ‡ Connie Finnan withdrew because of personal reasons.

Round 1

Round 2

Friday 8 June; Best of 17 legs

Round 3

 † Gary Anderson hit a nine-dart finish in the third leg against Davey Dodds.
 ‡ Dennis Smith received a bye as Mark Jones was disqualified due to failing to register at the event.

Saturday 9 June; Best of 17 legs

Round 4

Round 5

Sunday 10 June

Quarter-finals to final

See also
UK Open history of event and previous winners
2012 PDC Pro Tour includes extended results of Pro Tour events
PDC Pro Tour history of PDC "floor events"

References

External links
The official PDC page for the UK Open

UK Open
UK Open Darts
UK Open (darts)
UK Open (darts)
UK Open (darts)
Sport in the Metropolitan Borough of Bolton